Stephen Island is an ice-covered island about 4 nautical miles (7 km) long lying at the west side of Nickerson Ice Shelf, off the coast of Marie Byrd Land. It was mapped from surveys by the United States Geological Survey (USGS) and U.S. Navy air photos (1959–65). Its name was chosen by the Advisory Committee on Antarctic Names (US-ACAN) for Alexander Stephen (1795–1875), Scottish shipbuilder of Alexander Stephen and Sons, whose firm built the Sir Ernest Shackleton and Admiral Richard Byrd in their expeditions to the Antarctic.

See also 
 List of Antarctic and sub-Antarctic islands

Islands of Marie Byrd Land